The Songs of the Jewish Shtetle is a cultural musical project aimed at preserving the Jewish cultural heritage. The project has gathered songs in Yiddish, a language put on the Red List of Threatened Languages by UNESCO. 
Before World War II the number of native Yiddish speakers amounted to 11 million people. During the Holocaust 6 million Jewish people were killed, thus the number of Yiddish speakers halved. The language continued in literature, oral speech, Ashkenazi folklore, and in songs. The project is unique as the Jewish songs in Yiddish, which had been persecuted in various places that Jews had settled, and generally played only by small klezmer ensembles beforehand, were for the first time performed by a large symphony orchestra.

Reception
Efim Alexandrov, the author, art director and soloist of the project, Honoured Artist of the Russian Federation, singer and custodian of Yiddish song tradition, was awarded for his cultural activities including this project, with the Russian National Award “Person of the Year” in 2001 and the “Person of the Year – 5764” Award of the Federation of Jewish Communities of Russia in 2004. At "The Golden Nine" annual ceremony, where those who contributed most to all the spheres of Israeli society are rewarded, Efim Alexandrov was awarded by Israel television channel Israel Plus the special prize of "The Golden Nine" for his contribution to the world Jewish culture.

Concert programs
In 2001 the first night of The Songs of Jewish Shtetle was held at the Novaya Opera theatre in Moscow under the patronage of the International Charity Fund of Yuri Bashmet.

The concert program included not only the songs created in Jewish shtetles in the Yiddish language, but also those that were written by people who left the shtetles after the Pale of Settlement had been abolished. In the 10 years since the project commenced, several concert programs have been created, and over 150 The Songs of Jewish Shtetle concerts have been played in the USA, Canada, Germany, Israel, Australia, Russia, and CIS countries. Together with the Russian State Symphony Cinema Orchestra conducted by Sergey Skripka. Efim Alexandrov recorded several CDs of songs from Jewish shtetles of Russia, Belarus, and Ukraine. Two concerts, one at the Novaya Opera theatre in Moscow, the other at the State Central Concert Hall “Rossiya”, were filmed and later broadcast in many countries. The project presents traditional Jewish folk songs, as well as songs composed by S. Kemelmakher, E.Alexandrov, V.Shainsky, I.Lyublinsky, lyrics by S.Kemelmakher, B.Zitserman, M.Tanich, I.Kerler and others. Since 2001 several concert programs were created.

The first concert program of The Songs of Jewish Shtetle featured songs that were included in "The Songs of Jewish Shtetle" music album:
 Lechaim
 Kinder yorn
 Kuzine()
 A yidishe mame
 Fregt vos ken ikh
 Gefilte fish
 Moishele main fraint
 Rebe
Koift zhe papirosn
 Tumbalalaika
 Ich hob dikh tsufil lib
 Itsik hot shoin khasene gehat
 Potpourri of Jewish songs

The second concert program of The Songs of Jewish Shtetle featured songs that were included in "The Songs of Jewish Shtetle-2" music album:
 Lechaim. Theme from Fiddler on the Roof by Jerry Bock
 A kleinichker vintele
 Bai mir bistu shein
 Main Bershad.
 Yidishe maiholim
 Tzip tzip hemrl
 Main tate
 Wu nemt men a bisele mazl
 A koshere kachke
 Sholem aleihem

Participants
 Directors: Aleksej Garnizov (2001) and Ljubov Grechishnikova (2005)
 Choreographers: Jurij Carenko (2001) and Nikolaj Androsov
 Art director: Aleksandr Grimm
 Sound producers: Gennadij Papin, Sergej Remezov
 Conductor: Sergej Skripka
 Directors of television versions:
 Lina Arifulina (2001) and Artjom Shadrov (2005)
 Arranger: Jurij Jakushev
 Literary editors and advisers:
 Boris Zicerman, Marija Kotljarova and Aleksandr Gercberg

The Musical and the Theatrical group:
 Russian State Symphony Cinema Orchestra
 Group of solo-instrumentalists of the State Jazz Music Chamber Orchestra of O.Lundstrem
 The State Ballet "Kostroma" (2001)
 The Moscow State Ensemble of Dance “Russian seasons”
 The vocal ensemble “A' cappella express”.
 The vocal ensemble "Vocal-Band"
 The vocal ensemble "Moscow-Transit"
 An academical chorus under the leadership of Ljudmila Urman
 A concert chorus under the leadership of V. Rybin
 Actors of the Theatre of National Art under the leadership of V. Nazarov
 The Boys’ Choir of the Moscow Choral School named after Sveshnikov
 Children's choreographic ensemble "Buratino"
 “The Moscow Music-Hall”

References

External links 
 Official site
 Yuri Bashmet, Efim Alexandrov "The Songs of the Jewish Shtetle" - YouTube
 I Love You So Much - Efim Alexandrov - YouTube
 Moishele / Efim Alexandrov - YouTube

Concerts
Yiddish-language music
UNESCO
Jewish music